Joseph A. Fidel (October 14, 1923 – May 13, 2015) was an American politician and businessman who served as a member of the New Mexico State Senate from 1973 to 2006.

Early life 
Fidel was born in Bibo, New Mexico, the son of a Lebanese immigrant, Abdoo Habeeb Fadel (later Anglicized as A.H. Fidel).

Career 
Fidel was the owner of a realty company. In 2009, the Cibola Beacon named Fidel as Person of the Decade. Fidel served as assessor of Valencia County, New Mexico. He also served on the Grants, New Mexico city council and the school board. Fidel served as a member of the New Mexico Senate from 1973 to 2006.

Death 
Fidel died in Grants, New Mexico at the age of 91.

References

1923 births
2015 deaths
People from Cibola County, New Mexico
American politicians of Lebanese descent
Businesspeople from New Mexico
New Mexico city council members
School board members in New Mexico
Democratic Party New Mexico state senators
People from Valencia County, New Mexico
People from Grants, New Mexico
20th-century American businesspeople